The Algeria national under-23 football team represents Algeria in international football competitions including the Olympic Games. The selection is limited to players under the age of 23, except during the Olympic Games where the use of three overage players is allowed. The team is controlled by the Algerian Football Federation.

History
Algeria first appeared in the final of the Summer Olympics held in Moscow in 1980. They managed to reach the quarter finals of the tournament.

In 2015, the under-23 team finished runners-up in the Africa Cup of Nations tournament. They lost to Nigeria 2–1 in Dakar, Senegal where the tournament was hosted. Algeria missed an opportunity to level in the second half. Zinedine Ferhat had a penalty saved by Nigeria goalkeeper Daniel Emmanuel in the 68th minute. Algeria clinched their place in the 2016 Summer Olympics men's football tournament in Rio de Janeiro by beating South Africa 2–0 in the semi-final of the Africa Cup of Nations.

Kit history

1st Kit

2nd Kit

Honours
Summer Olympic Games:
 Quarter-final: 1980
U-23 Africa Cup of Nations
 Runners-up: 2015
African Games:
 Gold Medalists: 1978
UNAF U-23 Tournament:
 Champions: 2007, 2010
 Runners-up: 2006, 2011
Islamic Solidarity Games:
 Bronze Medalists: 2017

Competitive record

Olympic Games record

 Prior to the Barcelona 1992 campaign, the Football at the Summer Olympics was open to full senior national teams.

African Games record

 Prior to the Cairo 1991 campaign, the Football at the African Games was open to full senior national teams.
 Algeria disqualified in the qualification match after beating Tunisia, for professional players on the Algeria team

Africa U-23 Cup of Nations record

UNAF U-23 Tournament record

Islamic Solidarity Games

Team

Current squad
The following list of players were selected for the 2022 Maurice Revello Tournament between 29 May – 12 June 2022.

Caps and goals correct as of 28 May 2022.

Notable players
 Lakhdar Belloumi
 Salah Assad
 Rabah Madjer
 Ali Fergani

Former squads
 1980 Summer Olympics squads - Algeria
 2011 CAF U-23 Championship squads - Algeria
 2015 U-23 Africa Cup of Nations squads - Algeria

See also
 Algeria national football team

References

External links
Algerian FA

 
African national under-23 association football teams
under-23